Sergio Guzmán Lira (20 June 1924 – 2016) was a Chilean sprinter. He competed in the men's 4 × 400 metres relay at the 1948 Summer Olympics.

References

1924 births
2016 deaths
Athletes (track and field) at the 1948 Summer Olympics
Chilean male sprinters
Chilean male hurdlers
Olympic athletes of Chile
Place of birth missing
20th-century Chilean people